The Nuestra Belleza Paraguay 2014 pageant was held at the Yacht & Golf Club Paraguayo on September 13th, 2014 to select Paraguayan representatives to the 4 major beauty pageants. Guadalupe González, Miss Universe Paraguay 2013, Coral Ruiz, Miss World Paraguay 2013, Marta Raviolo, Miss International Paraguay 2013, and Leticia Cáceres, Miss Earth Paraguay 2013, crowned their successors: Sally Jara, Myriam Arévalos, Jéssica Servín and Sendy Cáceres, respectively. It was broadcast live on LaTele.

Results

Delegates
There are 15 official contestants.

Contestants notes
 Laura Garcete previously joined Nuestra Belleza Paraguay 2013 where she ended up in 5th place, she later represented her country at Miss United Continents 2013 held Ecuador.
 Sendy Cáceres have previously represented Paraguay at Miss Grand International 2013 held Thailand.
 Myriam Arévalos, representing her country, won the Miss Tourism Universal 2012 pageant held in Ecuador.
 Some of the candidates were chosen on regional pageants: Karina Viveros, Silfide Villalba, Rocío Cantero and Sendy Cáceres.

See also
Miss Paraguay
Miss Universe 2014
Miss World 2014
Miss International 2014
Miss Earth 2014

External links
Promociones Gloria, holder of the franchises.
Nuestra Belleza Paraguay Facebook Page

References

2014
2014 beauty pageants
2014 in Paraguay
September 2014 events in South America